The 1948–49 season is Farouk Sporting Club's 38th season of football, and the 1st season in the Egyptian Premier League, The club also played in the Cairo league and Egypt cup.

Egyptian Premier League

League table

Matches

Egypt Cup

Cairo Zone League 

Cairo league champion was decided by results of Cairo teams in national league with no separate matches for Cairo league competition.

Table

Matches

References
 http://www.angelfire.com/ak/EgyptianSports/ZamalekLeagueGames4849.html
 http://www.angelfire.com/ak/EgyptianSports/ZamalekInEgyptCup.html#1949

Zamalek SC seasons
Farouk